The 2nd constituency of Mayenne is a French legislative constituency in the Mayenne département.

Historic representation

Election results

2022

2017

2012

 
 
 
 
 
 
 
|-
| colspan="8" bgcolor="#E9E9E9"|
|-

2007

Sources
 Official results of French elections from 1998:

References 

2